Charles Allan Hill (July 6, 1951 – December 30, 2013) was a Native American stand-up comedian, actor, and member of the Oneida Nation of Wisconsin. He wrote for the television series Roseanne.  He was the first Native American to be a TV comedy stand-up star.

Early life and education 
Born in Detroit, Michigan in 1951, he moved as a child with his family when they returned to their homestead on the Oneida reservation in 1962.

In 1969, he graduated from West De Pere High School and enrolled at University of Wisconsin–Madison, where he majored in speech and drama. He was involved in the Broom Street Theatre Group.

During the early 1970s, he was a member of Hanay Geiogomah's Native American Theatre Ensemble. Among other productions, the ensemble performed Coyote Tracks and Foghorn at La MaMa Experimental Theatre Club in the East Village of Manhattan, where the ensemble was in residence. The ensemble also toured Germany in 1973 and the United States in 1974.

After college, Hill moved to Los Angeles and worked as an actor and comedian.

Career 
Hill's first network appearance was on The Richard Pryor Show in 1977. He also appeared on The Tonight Show with Johnny Carson, The Tonight Show with Jay Leno, and made multiple appearances on Late Night with David Letterman.

Hill was chosen to host for the First Americans in the Arts awards show in Hollywood three times. One time, he co-hosted with the Oneida singer Joanne Shenandoah. As a stand-up comedian, he appeared in venues internationally and was a regular at The Comedy Store in Hollywood.

Hill appeared on many television shows, and hosted an evening of Native American comedians on a Showtime special. He was the subject of the PBS documentary On and Off The Res' with Charlie Hill (1999), directed by Sandra Osawa.

Hill was interviewed about American Indian Movement activist Dennis Banks in the documentary A Good Day to Die.

Hill starred in the 1984 film Harold of Orange, written by Gerald Vizenor.

Awards and recognition 

 2009: Ivy Bethune Tri-Union Diversity Award
 2010: "Native America on the Web" honored Hill for his "lifetime of promoting positive images of Native Peoples and bridging cultural differences through the healing power of humor"
 2022: On July 6, the Google Doodle was dedicated to Hill in recognition of his challenging harmful stereotypes in the entertainment industry as well as being the first Native comedian to be on national television.

Selected film and television credits 

 2010: A Good Day to Die (Hill is interviewed about Dennis Banks)
 2009: Reel Injun (documentary; comedy routine by Hill)
 2009: Goin' Native: The Indian Comedy Slam – No Reservations Needed (television film)
 2009: The Longest Walk Through Hollywood (documentary)
 2004–2006: Late Show with David Letterman
 2005: CBC Winnipeg Comedy Festival (television series)
 2004: City Confidential (television documentary)
 1999: On and Off the Res with Charlie Hill (documentary)
1996: White Shamans and Plastic Medicine Men (documentary short)
 1996: Moesha (television series)
 1995: Roseanne 
 1993: North of 60 (television series)
 1992: The Tonight Show with Jay Leno 
 1986: Impure Thoughts
 1985: MacGruder and Loud (television series)
 1985: Spenser (television series)
 1985: Late Night with David Letterman 
 1984: Earthlings (television film)
 1984: Harold of Orange (short film)
 1980: The Big Show (television series)
 1978: The Bionic Woman (television series)
 1977: The Richard Pryor Show

Death 
Hill died on December 30, 2013, in Oneida, Wisconsin, of lymphoma.

References

External links 
 
 
 Hill's page on La MaMa Archives Digital Collections

1951 births
2013 deaths
Deaths from lymphoma
American male comedians
Native American male actors
American television writers
American male television writers
American male television actors
Male actors from Wisconsin
Male actors from Detroit
People from Oneida, Wisconsin
University of Wisconsin–Madison alumni
20th-century American male actors
21st-century American male actors
Deaths from cancer in Wisconsin
Screenwriters from Wisconsin
Screenwriters from Michigan
20th-century American comedians
21st-century American comedians
Comedians from Wisconsin
Comedians from Michigan
Native American screenwriters
20th-century American screenwriters
20th-century American male writers
Native American people from Michigan